Sathriyan is a 2017 Indian Tamil-language action drama film written and directed by S. R. Prabhakaran and produced by Sathya Jyothi Films. The film was shot in Tiruchirappalli and features Vikram Prabhu and Manjima Mohan. Kavin, Aishwarya Dutta and 
Rio Raj play supporting roles. The music was composed by Yuvan Shankar Raja with cinematography by Sivakumar Vijayan and editing by M. Venkat. The film was released on 9 June 2017.

Plot 
Niranjana (Manjima Mohan) is the daughter of the biggest rowdy in Tiruchirapalli, Samuthiram (Sharath Lohitashwa), who works for the minister (Poster Nandakumar) as his minion. The minister calls Samuthiram and tells him to come to one of his factories alone to deal with a personal matter. Samuthiram, upon arriving, becomes suspicious as no one is present and calls Ravi, his second-in-command, and asks for one of their boys to come check on him. Meanwhile, the minister's goon Shankar (Aruldoss) and his gang arrive and kill Samuthiram for meeting with the opposing party's minister.

Guna (Vikram Prabhu), having been sent by Ravi, arrives and finds Samuthiram dead, and the gang hold a funeral with Samuthiram's family, and Ravi swears loyalty to them. Guna kills a goon from Shankar's gang for becoming an approver. Meanshile, some guys have been harassing Niranjana at her college bus stop for weeks. Her mother asks Ravi to send someone to take care of it. Ravi sends Guna, who slashes the guy's arm. Later, that guy's friends threaten to throw acid on Niranjana if he does not recover, and Guna is tasked with following and keeping Niranjana safe until she finishes college. She slowly falls in love with him and proposes to Guna, but he refuses, saying that love will not work for him and how the people in the town respect and fear him. She asks him to spend a day without any weapons. He does this but learns that Shankar's men are following him on that very day.

The next day, Niranjana asks Guna if he was scared even for a minute because he had no weapons with him. She tells him that he was not fearing the enemy but their weapons, in the same way the town's people are afraid of his weapons and not him. She tells him to come out of this delusion and seriously consider starting a life and family for himself. She also says she will wait for him until then. Guna then starts reciprocating her feelings. Guna tells Ravi about his love for Niranjana, but Ravi tells Guna to forget her as it is not appropriate. Meanwhile, Shankar's gang follows Guna to kill him, and he gets stabbed but survives with the help of Dr. Chandran (Kavin). Niranjana's family learns about Guna's relationship with her and refuses to accept it. Guna gets into a scuffle with Niranjana's brother. Shankar and his gang try to kill Guna again, and Guna ends up killing Shankar and eloping with Niranjana to Thondi while Ravi and the police continue to search for him. Guna asks Chandran to fetch  7 lakhs, his passport, and his mother's Thali (wedding chain) from his home and Chandran goes to Guna's house. One of Ravi's men informs Ravi about someone's presence in the house. Ravi and three of his men wait outside to stab the man as they think it is Guna. They stab the man, who turns out to be Chandran. Ravi asks where Guna is, but Chandran refuses to tell and Ravi tells him to tell Guna that he will find them and bring Niranjana home by killing Guna even if it takes 10 years and lets Chandran go.

Guna is furious that Ravi, whom he thought of as his own brother, tried to kill him. He goes to Trichy where a chase and fight ensue between Guna, Ravi and his gang with Guna gaining the upper hand and slashing Ravi multiple times. Ravi asks him to kill him, but Guna cannot bring himself to do that, and asks Ravi to leave everything like him and takes him to the hospital. Guna also convinces his friend from Shankar's gang to leave the violent life behind and join him. The film ends with Guna, Niranjana, Chandran and his girlfriend (Aishwarya Dutta), having married and Ravi with his wife and children coming to Niranjana's home and her mother taking an aarti to everyone.

Cast

 Vikram Prabhu as Gunasekaran "Guna"
 Manjima Mohan as Niranjana
 Kavin as Dr. Chandran
 Aishwarya Dutta as Dr. Chandran's love interest (girlfriend)
 Rio Raj as Guna's friend
 Sharath Lohitashwa as Samuthiram, Niranjana's father
 Aadukalam Naren as Vijayan
 Soundararaja as Niranjan
 Poster Nandakumar as Minister
 Aruldoss as Shankar
 R. K. Vijay Murugan as Ravi
 Tara as Niranjana's mother
 Yogi Babu as Samudhram's nephew
 Florent Pereira as Police Commissioner
 Sundari Divya as Kavi
 Veluthu Kattu Kathir as Kani
 Vishnu Priya as Niranjana's friend
 Supergood Subramani  as Policeman

Production

Sathya Jyothi Films signed on director S. R. Prabhakaran to direct a film for their production house during the middle of 2015, with Vikram Prabhu joining the team in September 2015 to portray the leading role. The film, featuring music by Yuvan Shankar Raja and cinematography by Sivakumar Vijayan, was initially set to be launched in early December 2015, but the 2015 South Indian floods meant that the event was delayed by a month. In December 2015, Manjima Mohan was signed on to portray the leading role before the release of her first Tamil venture.

The film's title of Mudi Sooda Mannan was announced in June 2016, before the title was changed to Sathriyan.

Release
The satellite rights of the film were sold to Sun TV. Baradwaj Rangan of Film Companion wrote "The biggest problem is the running time, over two-and-a-half hours"

Soundtrack

The soundtrack was composed by Yuvan Shankar Raja, and the audio was released on 30 January 2017. Behindwoods stated, "A short album that has the stamp of Yuvan Shankar Raja! Very specific and to the point composing by YSR for Sathriyan". the songs Paarai Mele and Sathriyan In Action (Theme) were well received.

References

External links
 

2017 films
Indian action drama films
2010s Tamil-language films
Films shot in Tiruchirappalli
Films set in Tiruchirappalli
Indian gangster films
Films scored by Yuvan Shankar Raja
2017 action drama films